Taiping is a town of Pingguo, Guangxi, China. , it had twenty villages under its administration:
Taiping Village
Paolie Village
Xinwei Village
Neihong Village
Gan'ai Village
Renqing Village
Chami Village
Buyang Village
Juping Village
Gu'an Village
Longzhu Village
Zhuanglie Village
Yanshan Village
Nagong Village
Jilin Village
Linlin Village
Wangli Village
Yangliang Village
Qiliang Village
Bale Village

See also
List of township-level divisions of Guangxi

References

Towns of Guangxi
Pingguo
Towns and townships in Baise